The Gallagher Building is a historic commercial building located in Downtown Omaha, Nebraska. It was completed in 1888 in the Late Victorian style of architecture.

References

National Register of Historic Places in Omaha, Nebraska
Commercial buildings on the National Register of Historic Places in Nebraska
Commercial buildings completed in 1888